George Howe may refer to:
Sir George Grobham Howe, 1st Baronet (–1676), English politician
George Howe (physician) (1654/5–1710), Scottish physician
George Howe, 3rd Viscount Howe (1725–1758), British Army general
George Howe (printer) (1769–1821), Australian printer, editor and poet
George Howe (merchant) (1819–1899), American merchant and industrialist
George Curzon-Howe, 2nd Earl Howe (1821–1876), British peer
George Howe (attorney) (1824–1888), American lawyer
George Frederick Howe (1856–1937), British civil servant
George Howe (architect) (1886–1955), American architect
George L. Howe (1898–1977), author and intelligence operative in World War II
George Howe (actor) (1900–1986), English actor and comedian
George Howe (footballer) (1924–1971), English footballer
George A. Howe (died 1909), Massachusetts politician
George Howe (priest) (born 1952), Anglican priest
George W. Howe, American psychologist
George Howe (politician), American politician in the Michigan House of Representatives

See also
Howe (surname)